Akmal bin Azmi (born 9 April 1998) is a Malaysian professional footballer who plays as a forward for Malaysia club Langkawi City in the Malaysia M3 League.

Club career
On 15 July 2017, Akmal made his first-team debut for  2017 season coming on match against Selangor of 1–1 draw at Darul Aman.

Career statistics

Club

References

External links

1998 births
Malaysian footballers
Living people
Kedah Darul Aman F.C. players
Association football forwards